Sooshi Mango is an Australian comedy troupe founded in 2015. The group consists of two brothers, Joe and Carlo Salanitri, and their best friend, Andrew Manfre. Sooshi Mango is best known for their comedy skits, acts, videos, series and live shows, paying homage to their experiences growing up in an Italian family, and around Italians, Greeks, and ethnic cultures living in Australia.

The comedic influences of the group include Dean Martin and Jerry Lewis, the Marx Brothers, Laurel and Hardy, Benny Hill and many more. Being most strongly inspired by their European ancestry, their content is commonly rooted in humorously depicting the Italian and Greek ethnic and cultural diaspora and their role in Australian society, and its racial prejudice and social mechanisms of the modern-day world.

Sooshi Mango features many characters in their skits, with characters Johnny, Vince and Sam being seen in the majority of their videos. With over 350 million views and counting, Sooshi Mango has been featured in four theatrical shows in multiple countries. The troupe's first solo theatre show, Fifty Shades of Ethnic, was performed 45 times in over 10 cities. Sooshi Mango have also done advertisements for numerous companies, have begun a podcast and won the AACTA Comedy Awards. Sooshi Mango began writing a script for their first own feature-length film in 2022.

History
The troupe's name originated in 2015 from Joe Salanitri's son, who, when Joe and Carlo were trying to think of a name for their comedy group, shouted the two words whilst running through the house. Joe and Carlo decided to adopt the name due to its silliness. At this time, Carlo Salinitri was the owner of a lighting shop, Joe Salinitri was a scrap metal merchant and Manfre worked as a salesman. Sooshi Mango first gained popularity when they started in 2015 upon the virality of their video Italians Vs Greeks and Ethnic Dads on Facebook. Joe Salinitri said of the Ethnic Dads skit, "We decided to do a video about ethnic dads and that was the first video we did that sort of cracked eight, nine million views." Manfre thought of their heritage comedy, "It's important that we leave a legacy behind just to remember that they [our parents] were here, they worked hard and they contributed to the country for me. That's my motivation."

Sooshi Mango has worked with several personalities, including Nick Giannopoulos and Mary Coustas. The trio has been able to transform their comedy to the stage and has had success touring internationally and several times in Australia. Their first show on stage was ‘Star Wogs’ in 2018, which also featured Nick Giannopoulos, along with Mary Coustas. The Sooshi Mango crew have stated that they believe Star Wogs was the show that lifted their skills in acting. Sooshi Mango conducted two of their own shows in 2019. Ethnic Vacation – The Invasion of Canada was an international show that was performed in three of Canada's major cities. Fifty Shades Of Ethnic took place in Australia, which proved to be extremely successful in over 10 Australian cities.

Sooshi Mango later announced a new show named 'Off The Boat, that was set to come to the stage in 2021, however it was later rescheduled to early 2022 due to the COVID-19 pandemic. This show marked their biggest performance to date at the time, taking place in arenas. Before the delay was made, Sooshi Mango released a new brand of Pino Silvestre before Father's Day. September 2021 saw Sooshi Mango announce a new podcast titled Saucy Meatballs: A Podcast Not About Meatballs, which the trio had been wanting to host for over three years. In late 2021, Sooshi Mango were nominated for and won the AACTA Favourite Digital Comedy Creator award. Off The Boat finally concluded in September 2022 and the addition of extra and encore shows raised their total show count to 44. The show marked the troupe's biggest event.

Sooshi Mango made their debut in cinemas in October 2022, with a feature role for the trio in Giannopoulos' Wog Boy 3: Wog Boys Forever. Manfre told the Greek Herald, "It's an absolute honour and a privilege to be a part of the movie. We've all grown up watching it so to be a part of the trilogy is unbelievable." In 2022, it was confirmed that Sooshi Mango would begin scripting their own feature-length film. Sooshi Mango were nominated for the same AACTA Award in 2022, but did not win.

Podcast
Season 1 (2021)

Season 2 (2022)

Characters
Throughout the history of their comedy troupe, Sooshi Mango has featured numerous ethnic characters in their skits, videos, advertisements and theatre shows, all of which can be seen below. The Sooshi Mango cast revealed the characters' backstories in their 2022 show, Off The Boat.

Main charactersJohnny (played by Joe Salanitri) – Johnny is one of Sooshi Mango's main characters and is portrayed by Joe Salanitri. He is made fun of by Vince and Sam for having a large nose. He has a wife and at least one son and daughter. He migrated to Australia with Vince and Sam in 1967. Johnny does not like his neighbour, Shane.Vince (played by Carlo Salanitri) – Vince is the second main character, played by Carlo Salanitri. He often jokes about his wife, Carmela, and has a love–hate relationship with both his adjacent neighbours, Nunzio and Jeff. Along with Johnny and Sam, Vince arrived in Australia in 1967. He and Carmela have a son.Sam (played by Andrew Manfre) – Andrew Manfre is the actor for the final main character that makes up Sooshi Mango's ethnic dads. In 1967, Sam went fishing with his friend, Gino, and their boat took them to Australia. At 15 years old, Gino took Sam's girlfriend, now wife, Angela. Gino died in 2020.

Recurring charactersGiuseppina (played by Joe Salantri) – Johnny's wife, also played by Joe Salanitri. Giuseppina has been featured in numerous episodes with the rest of the ethnic mothers. Salanitri reprised his role of Giuseppina in an interview with Studio 10. Giuseppina and Johnny have a son and a daughter. Her daughter has slept with Angela's son, but is now engaged to a Greek man.Carmela (played by Carlo Salanitri) – Carlo Salanitri plays Carmela, Vince's wife. She and Vince often make fun of each other, and are confused as to why their son, Giuseppe, sees a psychologist. Carmela is not a fan of Giuseppe's wife, Sharon.Angela (played by Andrew Manfre) – The wife of Sam, whose son used to be in a relationship with Giuseppina's daughter. She and Sam have another ten children, including a daughter, and nine grandchildren. Angela had a crush on Sam's brother, but married Sam when his brother died.Costa (played by Carlo Salanitri) – The owner and boss of Kalamata Fish & Chips shop. He works at his shop with his nephew and Tasso. His nephew teases him for not being able to pronounce the word "chips".Tasso (played by Joe Salanitri) – A worker, who works in Kalamata Fish & Chips. He is from Kalamata. When migrating to Australia, he and Costa had the idea of starting a fish and chips business together.Stavro (played by Andrew Manfre) – A man, who comes to eat at Kalamata Fish & Chips. He explains that his cousin was run over by Uber Eats and that he had to sell his donkey to enable his wife to migrate to Australia, as he lost his money to the TAB. He is also beat by his wife.Giacomo (played by Carlo Salanitri) – Carlo Salanitri also portrays old married man Giacomo, who gives marital advice to Joe, with the help of Pino.Pino (played by Andrew Manfre) – An ethnic grandparent, who also gives advice to Joe. He has a wife. He and Giacomo came to Australia in the 1940s, when they accidentally boarded an immigration boat during World War II, believing it was an enemy ship.Joe (played by Joe Salanitri) – A young gas and sterioids salesman, acted by Joe Salanitri. When he tries to sell gas, he ends up getting marital advice. Joe is on parole.Tasoula''' (played by Joe Salinitri) – The Greek wife of Stavro, played by Joe Salinitri, who bashes Stavro for his TAB losses. She and Stavro have five daughters.

Reception
Sooshi Mango won the AACTA Favourite Digital Comedy Creator award in December 2021, in which they were contending against many entertaining personalities and were congratulated by many fans and celebrities, such as Scott Morrison.

Sooshi Mango's first show, Fifty Shades of Ethnic, went live 33 times in over 10 cities, completely selling out 14 times, while the trio have also brought their comedic skills to the international stage, airing shows in Canada's Toronto, Vancouver and Montréal. Aussie Theatre said that Sooshi Mango's Off The Boat tour will "bring the house down once more". Off The Boat broke the record of selling out three comedy shows at Rod Laver Arena and the entire tour sold over 100,000 tickets and 44 shows. Sooshi Mango have also done advertisements for a number of businesses, including Red Rooster and Azzurri Concrete. They have also branded their own line of Pino Silvestre.

Sooshi Mango has accumulated millions of views and followers across their socials channels with over 122,000 subscribers on YouTube alone. The comedy trio have been interviewed by Sunrise and multiple times by Studio 10. Sooshi Mango's podcast trailer reached the top ten most listened tracks on Spotify within 24 hours of being released and their interview with Scott Morrison mocked various Australian "scandals", including Joe Biden forgetting Morrison's name, Franco-Australian tensions, Australian vaccine issues and the resignation of Gladys Berejiklian. Sky News thought that Morrison had "put himself at the mercy of comedians" during their podcast skit with him. Ruby Staley of Time Out'' branded their comedy "quick wit and relatable".

References

External links
 

Australian comedy troupes
Australian TikTokers
Living people
Year of birth missing (living people)